Hanington may refer to:

People
Daniel Lionel Hanington (1839-1905) New Brunswick politician
Daniel Lionel Hanington (Admiral) (1921-1999) Rear-Admiral in the Canadian Navy

See also
 Hannington (disambiguation)